The Honda CB Twister is a 110 cc standard motorcycle produced by Honda Motorcycle and Scooter India (HMSI) in India since 2009. This model has been discontinued in India with its successor named Honda Livo. It is sold as the CB110 in Colombia and the Philippines.

References

External links 
  (India)

CB Twister
Standard motorcycles
Motorcycles introduced in 2009